WCRW was a "shared time" AM radio station in Chicago, Illinois; sharing its frequency with two other stations, (WEDC and WSBC), each broadcasting a part of the day. Clinton White, a radio engineer, started the station in 1926; it initially operated on 720 kHz from studios at Waveland and Pine Grove on Chicago's north side. White and his wife, Josephine, worked at their station as a team, with both sharing the on-air duties. Josephine claimed to be the first female disk jockey. While the Whites entertained friends and neighbors with their radio station, this programming was not able to pay the station's operating expenses.  They were able to stay afloat by selling segments of the station's air time to others.  German, Italian, and Swedish language programs paid the bills.

WCRW began sharing its frequency with radio stations WHT (owned by Chicago mayor William Hale Thompson) and WIBO. Its frequency soon changed: first to 760 kHz and then to 1340 kHz, where their new time-sharing partners were stations WPCC and WFKB. In 1927, Congress passed the Radio Act of 1927, which was designed to streamline the broadcasting industry; only those stations who proved to be providing community service were re-licensed for operation.  The station's foreign language programming was most helpful in this process. Once again, this brought a change of frequency to 1210 kHz and a time-sharing partnership with radio stations WSBC and WEDC, who also broadcast ethnic programming.  The next year, the Whites moved the station into the Embassy Hotel at Pine Grove and Diversey, on Chicago's Gold Coast.  WCRW then began identifying itself as "The Gold Coast Station".

The agreement with WEDC and WSBC called for WCRW to be on the air only five hours a day; the remainder of the 24 hours was divided between the other two stations. The three stations sharing the 1240 frequency in Chicago operated from three different locations with three separate transmitter sites; they continued to share this frequency for the next 70 years. From the 1920s through the 1960s, the three station managers met annually to decide their broadcasting hours.

When Clinton White died of a heart attack in 1963, Josephine brought Ed Jacker in as manager, chief engineer and ownership partner. Under Jacker's management, WCRW's power was increased, first to 250 watts and then finally to 1,000. As time passed, the ethnic groups served by the station's programming changed; eventually most of its five hours on the air became Spanish language programming.

After Josephine White's death, total ownership of WCRW went to Jacker, and eventually to his daughter. In 1989, the station left the Embassy Hotel for studios near Milwaukee and Bryn Mawr, on Chicago's northwest side.  Daniel Lee, who was now the owner of WSBC, purchased WCRW in June 1995 for $500,000. On June 17, 1996, WCRW signed off for the last time, almost 70 years after Clinton and Josephine White initially took to the airwaves.

References

Defunct radio stations in the United States
CRW
Radio stations established in 1926
Radio_stations_disestablished_in_1996 
1926_establishments_in_Illinois 
1996_disestablishments_in_Illinois
CRW